BRP Waray (LC-288) is a heavy landing craft of the Philippine Navy. Betano was decommissioned in December 2012 and stored until it was sold by the Australian government to the Philippine Navy to assist in improving the country's humanitarian and disaster relief capabilities.

Prior to commissioning with the Philippine Navy, the ship, together with the former HMAS Balikpapan and HMAS Wewak, underwent refurbishing, refit, and servicing works in Cebu for a few months.

The ship was commissioned to Philippine Navy, together with two other sister ships and a new landing platform dock, on 1 June 2016 in Manila.

Operational history
In November 2018, BRP Waray conducted a Community Outreach and Education Program to counter violent extremism in Barangay Doña Consuelo, Ozamiz City, Misamis Occidental that benefited 2,137 individuals. The crew of BRP Waray were later given the Military Merit Medal (Philippines) for their participation in the operation.

The crew of BRP Waray were later given the Bronze Cross Medal for their participation in the operation.

In June 2019, BRP Waray with personnel from the Naval Intelligence Service Unit 62 and Naval Special Operations Unit 6 intercepted M/L Lady Rosmina off the waters of Zamboanga City based on a tip that it was undertaking human trafficking operations. Over 100 victims were rescued, they were supposed to be brought to Malaysia thru Tawi-Tawi.

See also
 HMAS Betano (L 133)
 List of ships of the Philippine Navy

References

External links
Philippine Navy Official website
Naming and Code Designation of PN Ships

Balikpapan-class landing craft heavy of the Philippine Navy
Ships built in Queensland
1972 ships